Clyde Cyril Fernandes (born 18 October 1993) is an Indian professional footballer who plays as a defender for Ozone FC in the I-League 2nd Division.

Career
Born in Mumbai, Fernandes made his professional debut on 11 January 2016 with Mumbai FC in the I-League, against Shillong Lajong. He played 59 minutes before coming off as Mumbai drew 0–0.

International
Fernandes has played India at the under-16 level, going with the side to South Africa.

Career statistics

References

1995 births
Living people
Footballers from Mumbai
Indian footballers
Mumbai FC players
Association football defenders
I-League players
India youth international footballers